"Ain't No Way" is a song written by singer-songwriter Carolyn Franklin and sung by her elder sister Aretha Franklin as the B-side to her 1968 hit, "(Sweet Sweet Baby) Since You've Been Gone".
This song should not be confused with a different song of the same title, recorded by Aretha Franklin on her 2003 CD So Damn Happy: "Ain't No Way" by Barry J. Eastmond and Gordon Chambers.

History
Written by Carolyn Franklin, her sister Aretha recorded the song and released it on her acclaimed Lady Soul album. Released as the B-side of her top-five hit single, "(Sweet Sweet Baby) Since You've Been Gone", the song peaked at number 16 on the Billboard Hot 100 and number 9 on the Hot R&B Singles Chart in 1968. Carolyn and members of the Sweet Inspirations performed backing vocals on the track. The Sweet Inspirations' founder Cissy Houston showcased her operatic upper range during Franklin's bridges and the ending of the track.

Covers
 In 1974, Shirley Brown recorded an outtake cover of the track in her album Woman to Woman.
 In 1983, Whitney Houston made her world debut on The Merv Griffin Show singing the tune with mother Cissy Houston. Whitney performed the track several times during her 1994 U.S. Bodyguard World Tour. In 1997, she performed it live on her 1997 HBO special, Classic Whitney Live from Washington, D.C., and the 1999 VH-1 Divas Live special as a duet with Mary J. Blige.
 In 1988, singer Jean Carn covered the song for her album You're a Part of Me.
 In 1991, Cheryl Pepsii Riley scored a top 50 US R&B hot with a version produced by Full Force taken from her album Chapters.
 In 2005, Mary J. Blige covered the track as a duet with Patti LaBelle off LaBelle's Classic Moments album, with their version peaking at number 18 on the R&B charts. LaBelle had previously performed the song in tribute to Franklin twice in 1994, at the Essence Awards and the Kennedy Center Honors.
 Christina Aguilera performed in 2011 the song to great acclaim in a tribute to Aretha Franklin during the 53rd Grammy Awards.
 Amber Riley, who portrays Mercedes Jones in TV series Glee, covered the song in 2011 for the show's season 2 episode 17 ”A Night of Neglect”.
 In 2011, Joe Bonamassa and Beth Hart covered the song in their collaborative album, Don't Explain.
 In 2013, singer Sasha Allen performed the song in the U.S. TV series The Voice.
 In December 2017, singer Demi Lovato covered the song for Spotify Singles.
 In 2017, British group Corners sampled the song in their track of the same name on their debut album, Corners.
 For the television special Aretha! A GRAMMY Celebration for the Queen of Soul, Jennifer Hudson, who was chosen by Franklin to portray her in her biopic, performed the song to widespread acclaim as part of a medley including "Respect" and "Think".

Credits
Lead vocal and piano by Aretha Franklin
Background vocals by the Sweet Inspirations and Carolyn Franklin
Additional background vocals by Cissy Houston
Produced by Jerry Wexler

Charts

References

1968 singles
2005 singles
Songs written by Carolyn Franklin
Aretha Franklin songs
Patti LaBelle songs
Mary J. Blige songs
Song recordings produced by Jerry Wexler
Female vocal duets
1968 songs
Atlantic Records singles